Therapy Sessions is the eighth studio album by American singer David Archuleta. It is composed of ten original tracks and was released on May 20, 2020. Its first single, "Paralyzed", was released on August 27, 2019, followed by "Ok, All Right" on March 27, 2020.

Background 
Archuleta began work on Therapy Sessions as a result of his very own, which had him fighting a lot of worries and negativity that he had been feeling towards himself. Billboard described Therapy Sessions as "arguably, his most honest chapter yet".

Track listing

Charts

Accolades

Therapy Sessions was a finalist for the 2021 AML Award for lyrics.

References 

2020 albums
David Archuleta albums